Jiu Zhang ( Pinyin: Jiu Zhang) is a collection of poems attributed to Qu Yuan and printed in the Chu Ci (楚辭 Songs of Chu, sometimes Songs of the South).

Title translation
Jiu zhang is a transliteration of the title of this section of the Chu ci. Jiu means nine, as in the number. It is not entirely clear why this number was chosen to divide this work into sections, although performance purposes or imitation of prior Chu ci works are both likely factors. Zhang was commonly used in ancient Chinese to mean a section of a literary work, such as a paragraph of a prose piece or for a stanza of a song or poem. Jiu zhang may also be translated into English alternatively, such as Nine Declarations.

The nine pieces
The nine poems of the Jiu Zhang form a diverse collection.

Table of contents
The "Nine Pieces" consists of nine titles of poems:

Note that poem numbers 1, 6, 7, and 9 actually lack titles in the original text; rather, they are named for the sake of convenience after the first few words with which these poems begin. English titles based on David Hawkes' translations.

See also
Chu ci
List of Chuci contents
Liu An
Liu Xiang (scholar)
Qu Yuan
Song Yu
Wang Yi (librarian)

Notes

References
Hawkes, David, translation, introduction, and notes (2011 [1985]). Qu Yuan et al., The Songs of the South: An Ancient Chinese Anthology of Poems by Qu Yuan and Other Poets. London: Penguin Books. 

Chinese poems